"Shoot Me with Your Love" is a song by Northern Irish band D:Ream, released in June 1995 as the first single from their second album, World (1995). It was.the first of a three-single UK Top 40 run in 1995 for the band and also the highest peaking, reaching number seven on the UK Singles Chart and number three on the UK Dance Singles Chart. The follow-ups, "Party Up the World" and "The Power (Of All the Love in the World)", reached number 20 and 40, respectively. A music video was also produced to promote the single.

Critical reception
John Bush from AllMusic felt the song "mixes a disco style with more familiar house and pop elements, with Peter Cunnah's stronger-than-usual vocals." Larry Flick from Billboard described it as an "ebullient disco/house spinner that sparks with optimistic lyrics and a joy-ful vocal by front man Peter Cunnah. The chorus builds to anthemic proportions in the context of the track's rattling percussion and rolling piano lines." He also remarked "the tireless and oh-so-contagious tone" of the album version. Pan-European magazine Music & Media wrote that the singer "writes songs which will still be played in five years time. It's like George Michael's "Freedom II". Additional piano is played by Jools Holland." Chris Moore, head of music on Red Dragon/Cardiff gave it 36-40 plays a week. He said, "After all those rereleases and remixes of singles off their first album, it's good to finally get something new from D:Ream. It's a great pop record, bound to be top 5 in the UK." 

A reviewer from Music Week gave "Shoot Me with Your Love" three out of five, adding that it is "a rather unimaginative effort from Peter Cunnah, but it's got just enough of the feel-good factor to get arms waving and fans buying." In an retrospective review, Pop Rescue stated, "This is an extremely up-beat track and one that’s very catchy. Its mid-section choral breaks harks back to "Things Can Only Get Better"." James Hamilton of the RM Dance Update described it as a "'Na Na Hey Kiss Him Goodbye'-ishly chanted soaring, wukka-wukking, jangling and thumping joyous strider". Smash Hits declared it as a "fantastically energetic pop-dance single that will see D:Ream back where they belong - at the top of the charts."

Track listing
 12", UK (1995)
"Shoot Me with Your Love" (Loveland's 12" Pop'd Up Mix) – 6:49
"Shoot Me with Your Love" (Loveland's Full Metal Jacket Dub Mix) – 7:00
"Shoot Me with Your Love" (Re:Deamix) – 6:49
"Shoot Me with Your Love" (Daydreemer Mix) – 8:25

 12" single, US (1995)
"Shoot Me with Your Love" (Loveland's 12" Pop'd Up Mix) – 6:55
"Shoot Me with Your Love" (Loveland's Full Metal Jacket Dub Mix) – 7:02
"Shoot Me with Your Love" (Re:deam Mix) – 6:50
"Shoot Me with Your Love" (Junior's 12" Club Mix) – 8:50

 CD single, UK & Europe (1995)
"Shoot Me with Your Love" (Loveland's 7" Pop'd Up Mix) – 3:51
"Shoot Me with Your Love" (D:Reamix) – 3:46
"Shoot Me with Your Love" (Re:Deamix) – 6:49
"Shoot Me with Your Love" (Loveland's Full Metal Jacket Mix) – 7:00
"Shoot Me with Your Love" (Junior's 12" Club Mix) – 8:50

Charts

Release history

References

1995 singles
1995 songs
D Ream songs
Magnet Records singles
Songs written by Peter Cunnah